Vincent Marzello (July 4, 1951 – March 31, 2020) was an American actor.

Early life
Marzello was born in the New York borough of Brooklyn on July 4, 1951.  He trained at the Guildhall School of Music and Drama in London.

Career
Marzello was active on screen from 1976 in North America and Europe, his first role being in an episode of The Brothers. Thereafter he appeared in productions that included The Spy Who Loved Me, Superman, Never Say Never Again, The Witches, Taggart, The House of Eliott, The Fragile Heart, Dalziel and Pascoe, Little Britain, Nuclear Secrets and Mile High.

Marzello also lent his voice to the character of Fernando Ramirez in the UFO: Afterlight computer game and appeared in the U.K. in radio series Flywheel, Shyster, and Flywheel (with his wife).

In 2006, he played Bob Zelnick in Frost/Nixon in London's West End, starting at the Donmar Warehouse in August and transferring to the Gielgud Theatre that November.

Personal life
He was married to the actress Lorelei King. They lived in London. During successful treatment for cancer in 2009, he was diagnosed with early onset dementia.

Vincent Marzello died on March 31, 2020 at the age of 68. His ashes are interred in Highgate Cemetery, alongside fellow actor, Ian Holm.

Filmography
The Brothers (1976, TV) as Chris Felton
The Spy Who Loved Me (1977) as USS Wayne Crewman #7
Superman (1978) as 1st Copy Boy 
Ike (1979, TV) as Mickey McKeogh
Superman II (1980) as 1st Copy Boy (uncredited)
Never Say Never Again (1983) as Colonel Culpepper
Odin: Photon Sailer Starlight (1985) as Cyborg / MC (1992) (English version, voice, uncredited)
John and Yoko: A Love Story (1985, TV Movie) as Anthony Cox
The Woman He Loved (1988, TV Movie) as Benny Thaw
Honor Bound (1988) as Hanley
Venus Wars (1989) as Barkeep / Mechanic (English version, voice, uncredited)
The Witches (1990) as Luke's Father
Taggart (1990, TV) as Enzo Fabrizzi
A Kid in King Arthur's Court (1995) as Dad
The Fragile Heart (1996, TV) as Hugh Lyle
Father Ted (1998, TV) as Television Psychiatrist
Velvet Goldmine (1998) as US Reporter 1
Dalziel and Pascoe (1998, TV) as Noah Seger
Bob the Builder (2000–2016, TV) as Farmer Pickles and Robert (US; voice)
Mike Bassett: England Manager (2001) as US Newsreader
Jack and the Beanstalk: The Real Story (2001, TV) as Mr. Sprague 
Laws of Attraction (2004) as Lyman Hersh
Little Britain (2004, TV) as President
Mile High (2005, TV) as Jed
Nuclear Secrets (2007, TV) as  McCone
Chuggington (2008, TV) as Action Chugger Movie Announcer (voice)
Planet 51 (2009) as Additional Voices
Just Cause 2 (2010, Video Game) as Tom Sheldon (voice)

References

External links

1951 births
2020 deaths
Burials at Highgate Cemetery
American male film actors
Male actors from New York City
20th-century American male actors
American male television actors
American male voice actors
American expatriates in the United Kingdom
21st-century American male actors
People from Brooklyn